Machhipal  is a village in Kapurthala district of Punjab State, India. The village is administrated by a Sarpanch, who is an elected representative.

Demography 
According to the report published by Census India in 2011, Machhipal has total number of 56 houses and population of 303 of which include 154 males and 149 females. Literacy rate of Machhipal is 62.79%, lower than state average of 75.84%.  The population of children under the age of 6 years is 45 which is 14.85% of total population of Machhipal, and child sex ratio is approximately  1143, higher than state average of 846.

Population data

Air travel connectivity 
The closest airport to the village is Sri Guru Ram Dass Jee International Airport.

Villages in Kapurthala

References

External links
  Villages in Kapurthala
 Kapurthala Villages List

Villages in Kapurthala district